Zachary Thomas Redmond (born July 26, 1988) is an American professional ice hockey defenseman currently playing for EHC München in the Deutsche Eishockey Liga (DEL). He was drafted by the Atlanta Thrashers in the seventh round, 184th overall, of the 2008 NHL Entry Draft.

Early life
Redmond was born in Traverse City, Michigan. He was born a triplet, along with brother Alex and sister Meghan. At the age of 15, Redmond suffered a transient ischemic attack stroke; as a result, he was forced to relearn how to walk and talk, but later returned to continue his junior hockey career.

Playing career
Following his collegiate career with Ferris State University, Redmond was signed to a three-year, entry-level contract with the Atlanta Thrashers on April 6, 2011. Following the Thrashers' relocation, his NHL rights were then transferred to the Winnipeg Jets.

Redmond scored his first career NHL goal, a short-handed marker, on February 7, 2013, against James Reimer of the Toronto Maple Leafs. On February 21, 2013, Redmond was rushed to a hospital in the Raleigh, North Carolina, area to repair a laceration to his right femoral artery and vein in his mid-thigh region, after he was seriously cut during the team's morning skate. He was expected to miss the remainder of the 2012–13 season. On April 4, however, Redmond resumed skating with his teammates and revealed that his recovery was well ahead of schedule, with doctors and trainers describing the pace of his recovery as "miraculous." He was expected to be ready for training camp in September 2013 and did not rule out the possibility of an earlier return if the Jets were to enjoy a deep 2013 Stanley Cup playoff run.

Redmond marked his return to hockey in the following 2013–14 season, with the Jets' American Hockey League (AHL) affiliate, the St. John's IceCaps. After two games with the IceCaps, he was then recalled to Winnipeg on November 3, 2013. By season's end, Redmond was recalled four times by the Jets, appearing in only ten games with three points. Having played primarily in the AHL, he was instrumental in helping St. John's reach their first Calder Cup Finals.

Falling short of the NHL games-played requirement throughout his entry-level contract, partly due to the serious leg injury he sustained the previous season, Redmond attained free-agent status. On July 1, 2014, he was subsequently signed to a two-year contract with the Colorado Avalanche. Redmond made the Avalanche roster to begin the 2014–15 season and later made his Avalanche debut, recording an assist in a 7–3 victory over the Vancouver Canucks on October 24, 2014. He scored his first Avalanche goal in his fifth game with the team in a 4–3 defeat to the Philadelphia Flyers on November 9, 2014. Redmond further cemented a position on the blueline when he scored a career-high two goals, including the game-winner, in the final minutes against the Carolina Hurricanes on November 22. In his first full season in the NHL, Redmond finished third amongst Avalanche defenseman in scoring, with five goals and 20 points in 59 games.

At the conclusion of his contract with the Avalanche, Redmond left as a free agent to sign a two-year contract with the Montreal Canadiens on July 1, 2016.

Approaching the final year of his contract with the Canadiens and unable to make the NHL roster to open the 2017–18 season, Redmond was traded by Montreal to the Buffalo Sabres for Nicolas Deslauriers on October 4, 2017. He was immediately reassigned to AHL affiliate, the Rochester Americans. Having recorded three points in his first four games with the Americans, Redmond was recalled by the injury-struck Sabres on October 21, 2017. Near the conclusion of the 2017–18 regular season, on April 5, 2018, Redmond was named to the AHL Second All-Star Team.

On June 13, 2018, Redmond opted to continue his tenure with the Americans, agreeing as an impending free agent to a two-year AHL contract.

At the conclusion of his contract with the Americans, having been productive over the course of his three seasons with limited NHL interest, Redmond opted to pursue a European career, agreeing to an initial one-year contract with German outfit, EHC München of the DEL, on April 26, 2020.

International play

At the conclusion of his first season with the Avalanche, Redmond was selected to represent the United States for the first time at the international stage in the 2015 World Championships in Prague. He made his debut for Team USA in a 4–2 round robin win against Russia on May 4, 2015. Redmond would finish the Tournament with one assist in five games to help claim a Bronze medal against hosts Czech Republic on May 17.

Career statistics

Regular season and playoffs

International

Awards and honors

References

External links

1988 births
Living people
American men's ice hockey defensemen
Atlanta Thrashers draft picks
Buffalo Sabres players
Chicago Wolves players
Colorado Avalanche players
Ferris State Bulldogs men's ice hockey players
Ice hockey players from Michigan
Montreal Canadiens players
EHC München players
Rochester Americans players
St. John's IceCaps players
San Antonio Rampage players
Sioux Falls Stampede players
Winnipeg Jets players
AHCA Division I men's ice hockey All-Americans
Sportspeople from Traverse City, Michigan